Dzole Stoychev Gergev ( and ) (1867 – 1909) also known as Atesh Pasha, was a Bulgarian revolutionary and freedom fighter, member of the Internal Macedonian-Adrianople Revolutionary Organization (IMARO)

Biography 

He was born in Banica, then in the Ottoman Empire. After entering IMRO, his first job was that of a courier and terrorists. He became chetnik with Tane Stoychev, and in 1903 became the leader of his own regiment in Lerin (Florina). In the summer of 1903 he participated in the Ilinden-Preobrazhenie uprising.
 
After the rebellion he became a district leader. After the Young Turk Revolution he joined the local police.

He was killed in Florina in 1909 by the Turks, after a Greek provocation.

References

External links 
Dzole Stojchev
VMRO History
Dzole Stojchev VMRO History

Bulgarians from Aegean Macedonia
Bulgarian revolutionaries
Members of the Internal Macedonian Revolutionary Organization
Macedonian Bulgarians
1867 births
1909 deaths
People from Meliti (municipal unit)